Gerard Michael Barrett (15 September 1925 – 15 October 2000) was an Australian rules football player who played six games for Geelong Football Club in 1944.

Barrett made six appearances for Geelong in 1944 while serving as a cook in the Royal Australian Air Force during World War II.

References

External links
 
 

1925 births
2000 deaths
Geelong Football Club players
Australian rules footballers from Victoria (Australia)
Royal Australian Air Force airmen
Royal Australian Air Force personnel of World War II